The 1995–96 South Midlands League season was 67th in the history of South Midlands League.

Premier Division

The Premier Division featured 15 clubs which competed in the division last season, along with 2 new clubs, promoted from last season's Senior Division: 
London Colney
Toddington Rovers

League table

Senior Division

The Senior Division featured 11 clubs which competed in the division last season, along with 3 new clubs: 
Houghton Town, promoted from Division One
Kent Athletic, promoted from Division One
Holmer Green, joined from Chiltonian League

League table

Division One

The Division One featured 10 clubs which competed in the division last season, along with 7 new clubs:
Pitstone & Ivinghoe, relegated from Senior Division
Leighton Athletic
Crawley Green Sports
Bridger Packaging
Buckingham United
Old Dunstablians
Old Bradwell United

League table

References

1995–96
8